WLN or wln may refer to:
 Walloon language (ISO 639-2 code)
 Western Library Network, merged into Online Computer Library Center
 West Lothian, council area in Scotland, Chapman code
 Wiswesser Line Notation, system for describing chemical structures
 Work and Learning Network, University of Alberta